Gunnedah, an electoral district of the Legislative Assembly in the Australian state of New South Wales was created in 1880 and abolished in 1904.


Election results

Elections in the 1900s

1901

Elections in the 1890s

1898

1895

1894

1891

Elections in the 1880s

1889

1888 by-election

1887

1885

1882

1880

References 

New South Wales state electoral results by district